Fresnes-sous-Coucy, formerly called Fresnes until 22 December 2017, is a commune in the Aisne department in Hauts-de-France in northern France.

Population

See also
Communes of the Aisne department

References

Communes of Aisne
Aisne communes articles needing translation from French Wikipedia